Eelam War I (23 July 1983 - 29 July 1987) is the name given to the initial phase of the armed conflict between the government of Sri Lanka and the LTTE.

Although tensions between the government and Tamil militant groups had been brewing since the 1970s, full-scale war did not break out until an attack by the LTTE on a Sri Lanka Army patrol in Jaffna, in the north of the country, on July 23, 1983, which killed 13 soldiers. The attack, and the subsequent riots in the south (dubbed Black July), are generally considered the start of the conflict.
The fighting continued until 1985 when peace talks were held between the two sides in Thimphu, Bhutan in hopes of seeking a negotiated settlement. The peace talks proved as fruitless and fighting soon resumed.

In 1987, the Vadamarachchi Operation of the Sri Lankan military had cornered the LTTE in Jaffna, on the tip of the island, and were confident of bringing an end to the conflict. However, due to internal pressure, specifically concern about the 50 million Tamils living in India, the Indian government called for a halt to the offensive. After the request was snubbed by Sri Lanka, the Indian Prime Minister Rajiv Gandhi ordered a flotilla of ships be sent to relieve the economic embargo imposed on the population in Jaffna. After the convoy was blocked by the Sri Lanka Navy, India instead chose to airdrop supplies to the besieged city in a mission codenamed Operation Poomalai.

Following the successful completion of the mission, and faced with the possibility of further involvement of the Indian military, including reports that Indian ground forces were being prepared for possible involvement in Sri Lanka, Sri Lanka President J. R. Jayewardene held talks with the Indian government to resolve the dispute. As a result of the negotiations, the siege of Jaffna was lifted and the Indo-Sri-Lankan Peace Accord was signed on July 29, 1987. Sri Lankan troops then withdraw from the north of the country and handed over control over the entire area to Indian peacekeeping troops named the Indian Peace Keeping Force. This brought about an end to the first stage of the ethnic conflict.

First suicide bombing 

In this armed conflict, the LTTE launched its first suicide attack with a truck bombing. On 5 July 1987, a suicide bomber Captain Miller drove a truck loaded with explosives and rammed the truck into the army camp at Nelliady Madhya Maha Vidyalayam. At least 40 Sri Lankan army were killed in that incident.

Civilian killings

Black July

On July 24, the day the 13 servicemen killed in an LTTE ambush were to be buried, some Sinhalese civilians who had gathered at the cemetery, angered by news of the ambush, which was magnified by wild rumor, formed mobs and started killing, raping, and assaulting Tamils while looting and burning their properties in retribution for what happened. Sinhalese civilians were equipped with voter registration lists, burning and attacking only Tamil residences and business, while army and government officials stood by. Even Sinhalese civilians who harbored Tamil families in their households (or suspected of doing so) were set upon by the mobs. It is estimated that at least 1,000[1] Tamil people were killed, tens of thousands of houses were destroyed, and a wave of Sri Lankan Tamils left for other countries

Kent and Dollar Farm massacres

In November 1984, Sinhalese convicts were settled in the Kent and Dollar farms after the Tamil civilians living there were evicted by the Sri Lankan Army. The settlement of prisoners was used to further harass Tamils into leaving the area. The Sinhala settlers confirmed that young Tamil women were abducted, brought there and gang-raped, first by the forces, next by prison guards and finally by prisoners.

Following this settlement, the LTTE committed their first massacre of Sinhalese civilians. The massacres took place on November 30, 1984, in two tiny farming villages in the district of Mullaitivu in north-eastern Sri Lanka.

Anuradhapura massacre

The Anuradhapura massacre is an incident on May 14, 1985, in which LTTE cadres massacred 146 Sinhalese men, women, and children in Anuradhapura. The LTTE hijacked a bus and entered Anuradhapura. As the LTTE cadres entered the main bus station, they opened fire indiscriminately with automatic weapons killing and wounding many civilians who were waiting for buses. LTTE cadres then drove to the Buddhist Sri Maha Bobhi shrine and gunned down nuns, monks and civilians as they prayed inside the Buddhist shrine. Before they withdraw, the LTTE strike force entered the national park of Wilpattu and killed 18 Sinhalese in the forest reserve. The attack was allegedly sparked by the 1985 Valvettiturai massacre, where the Sri Lanka Army massacred 70 Tamil civilians in the LTTE's leader hometown.

See also
Origins of the Sri Lankan Civil War

Eelam War II
Eelam War III
Eelam War IV
List of Sri Lankan Civil War battles
List of attacks attributed to the LTTE
Sri Lankan Civil War

References

External links
Ministry of Defence, Sri Lanka
Government of Sri Lanka Peace Secretariat
LTTE Peace Secretariat
Sri Lanka Monitoring Mission
Tamilnet

 
Phases of the Sri Lankan Civil War
1980s in Sri Lanka
1980s conflicts
Guerrilla wars
Tamil Eelam
History of Sri Lanka (1948–present)
Military history of Sri Lanka
1983 in Sri Lanka
1984 in Sri Lanka
1985 in Sri Lanka
1986 in Sri Lanka
1987 in Sri Lanka
Sri Lankan Civil War
Indian Peace Keeping Force